Kuyanly is a rural locality (a selo) in Seitovsky Selsoviet, Krasnoyarsky District, Astrakhan Oblast, Russia. The population was 2 as of 2010. There are 3 streets.

Geography 
Kuyanly is located 67 km northwest of Krasny Yar (the district's administrative centre) by road. Aysapay is the nearest rural locality.

References 

Rural localities in Krasnoyarsky District, Astrakhan Oblast